The 1992–93 Oklahoma State Cowboys basketball team represented Oklahoma State University as a member of the Big Eight Conference during the 1992–93 NCAA Division I men's basketball season. The team was led by third-year head coach Eddie Sutton and played their home games at Gallagher-Iba Arena. The Cowboys finished with a record of 20–9 (8–6 Big Eight) and tied for second in Big Eight regular season play.

Oklahoma State received an at-large bid to the NCAA tournament as No. 5 seed in the Midwest region. After defeating Marquette in the opening round, the Cowboys were defeated by Louisville, 78–63.

Roster

Source:

Schedule and results

|-
!colspan=9 style=| Regular Season

|-
!colspan=9 style=| Big Eight Tournament

|-
!colspan=9 style=| NCAA tournament

Rankings

Awards and honors
Bryant Reeves – Big Eight Player of the Year

References

Oklahoma State Cowboys basketball seasons
Oklahoma State
1992 in sports in Oklahoma
1993 in sports in Oklahoma
Oklahoma State